Ibn Ammar can refer to:
 al-Hasan ibn Ammar (fl. 962–997), Fatimid general and wasita
 Muhammad ibn Ammar (1031–1086), Andalusian poet and vizier of Seville